Gente de bien (English: "Decent people") is a 2014 French-Colombian drama film written and directed by Franco Lolli. It was screened in the International Critics' Week section at the 2014 Cannes Film Festival. It won the Grand Prix for Best Film at the 2014 Flanders International Film Festival Ghent.

Cast 
 Bryan Santamaria as Eric
 Carlos Fernando Perez as Eric's father
 Alejandra Borrero as Maria Isabel

References

External links 
 

2014 films
2014 drama films
2010s Spanish-language films
French drama films
Colombian drama films
2014 directorial debut films
2010s French films
2010s Colombian films